Golden Empire Transit is the operator of mass transportation in Bakersfield, California. There are 16 routes serving Greater Bakersfield, which includes both the City of Bakersfield and adjacent unincorporated communities. Since 2005, nearly the entire bus fleet is powered by compressed natural gas. In 2021, the fleet added 5 hydrogen buses, with an additional 5 planned for purchase in the future.

The government agency is an independent transit agency and is not directly associated with either the City of Bakersfield or the County of Kern. However, it co-ordinates with both the city and county, as well as the Kern Council of Governments (which represents most local governments in the county). It is also the direct descendant of the Bakersfield and Kern Electric Railway, which originally provided streetcar service to the city.

History 
Prior to the mid-1950s, public transportation in Bakersfield was provided by a private company named the Bakersfield Transit Company (formerly the Bakersfield and Kern Electric Railway). However, yearly losses resulted in the city acquiring it in 1956, under the new name Bakersfield Transit Agency. The city made little investments in the system. Already suffering from deferred maintenance from the previous owner, the lack of investment resulted in the system sinking into further disrepair. Operating losses were also increasing.

In 1973, voters approved a measure which established the Golden Empire Transit District. It would take over ownership and operation of the Bakersfield Transit Agency. The new transit district started purchasing new equipment. It also eliminated unnecessary routes. In 1986, the transit authority would undergo its first major alteration in the system. Previously, routes were running in circular routes. The company changed to a crosstown system. Buses operated on linear paths, and generally looped back when the bus needed to change direction. They also operated between transit hubs. The first was located downtown (Downtown Transit Center). Later a second was added at the Valley Plaza Mall, in the Southwest (Southwest Transit Center). A third transit center was built in 2011 on Panorama Drive at Bakersfield College. Golden Empire Transit implemented a new system of routes on October 7, 2012. The system transitioned from a crosstown system to an express/local system. Although the agency divides the system into five categories, it is easier to describe it in three: Express, Rapid, and Local. Express service runs between major destinations on the most direct route. It also makes a limited number of stops. Rapid service runs more frequently than express and makes more stops between end points. Local routes stop most frequently. Routes have been straightened for faster service. In 2021, GET built a transit center at CSU Bakersfield.

Routes

Local routes 
Routes that begin with either a "4" or a "6" are Local routes. Technically, Golden Empire Transit defines routes that begin with a "6" as Circulation routes, but they operate the same; except for the headway. Local routes make frequent stops. Routes that start with a "4" run every 30 minutes while routes that start with a "6" run every hour.

{| class=wikitable style="font-size: 95%;"
!Route
!Terminus
!width=250px|via
!Hubs Served
|-
|rowspan=2 style="background:white; color:black" align="center" valign=top|41
|Bakersfield College Transit Center
|rowspan=2|* Mt. Vernon Avenue* South Union Avenue* Panama Lane* White Lane
|rowspan=2|
|-
|Southwest Transit Center
|-
|rowspan=2 style="background:white; color:black" align="center" valign=top|42
|Golden Empire Transit OfficeGolden State Avenue / F Street
|rowspan=2|* 21st Street* Oak Street* Monitor Street
|rowspan=2|* Downtown Transit Center* Southwest Transit Center
|-
|WalmartPanama Lane / State Route 99
|-
|rowspan=2 style="background:white; color:black" align="center" valign=top|43
|Bakersfield College Transit Center
|rowspan=2|* Truxtun Avenue CBCC(Sat. Only) * Q Street (extends on Q Street and services on San Dimas behind Memorial Hospital)* Columbus Street
|rowspan=2|* Downtown Transit Center
|-
|Truxtun Avenue / Office Park Drive
|-
|style="background:white; color:black" align="center" valign=top|44
|Bakersfield College Transit Center
|* Mt. Vernon Avenue* S. Union Avenue* Ming Avenue* White Lane/McNair/Gosford
|
|-
|rowspan=2 style="background:white; color:black" align="center" valign=top|<div id=45>45
''</div>
|James Road / N. Chester Avenue
|rowspan=2|* McCray Drive* Buck Owens Boulevard* 24th StreetJames Road* Truxtun Avenue* Niles Street
|rowspan=2|* Downtown Transit Center
|-
|Foothill Boulevard / Morning Drive
|-
|rowspan=2 style="background:white; color:black" align="center" valign=top|46
|New Stine Road / Stockdale Highway
|rowspan=2|* Stockdale HighwayClinica Sierra Vista(Potomac)* 4th Street/Virginia Avenue* Pioneer Drive
|rowspan=2|
|-
|Foothill Boulevard / Weedpatch Highway
|-
|rowspan=2 style="background:white; color:black" align="center" valign=top|47
|Office Park Drive / Commercial Way
|rowspan=2|* New Stine Road/Stine Road* Panama Lane
|rowspan=2|
|-
|No longer goes to Panama/Walmart
|-
|rowspan=2 style="background:white; color:black" align="center" valign=top|61
|Bakersfield College Transit Center
|rowspan=2|* Columbus Avenue* Olive Drive* Coffee Road/Gosford Road* Harris Road
|rowspan=2|* Cal State Bakersfield Transit Center
|-
|Stine/Harris
|-
|rowspan=2 style="background:white; color:black" align="center" valign=top|62
|Southwest Transit Center
|rowspan=2|* Hughes Avenue* H Street* Hosking Avenue* Stine Road
|rowspan=2|
|-
|Panama Lane / Stine Road
|}

 Rapid routes 
Routes that begin with a "2" are Rapid routes. They make fewer stops than local and express routes, but run more frequently. Rapid routes run every 15 minutes.

 Express routes 
Routes that begin with an "8" are Express-Circulator routes. This group can generally be considered in two categories. Route 81 operates as in express for its entire length, stopping only at transit centers. Routes 82 and 84 run as express routes between the Downtown Transit Center and NW Promenade on Rosedale, and run local beyond the NW Promemade hub. Route 83 operates as in local for its entire length, making frequent stops. All four routes run either every 30 minutes, 45 minutes, or every hour.

 Long-Distance Express routes 
Routes that begin with a "9" are Long-Distance Express routes. They generally connect Bakersfield with large industrial centers (or other areas of large employment) outside of the city. They make only a few stops in Bakersfield, and then make no additional stops until reaching the industrial center. It will then make frequent stops within the center. Long-distance Express routes run every 2 hours, and generally do not run in the evenings. There is only one route in the system, X92.This route has an "X" before the route number. A Regular Day Pass for the Route X92 is $6.00. And a Monthly pass is $55.00. This route operates almost like the old service Route 16, it runs from Downtown Bakersfield to Tejon Ranch/IKEA, then comes back and ends service until 5:00PM at the Downtown Transit Center(Bakersfield). This route now parks in Bay F, in the Downtown Transit Center.

 Transit centers 

 Downtown Transit Center 
The Downtown Transit Center is the transit center primarily serving Northwest, North and East Bakersfield. It is located in Downtown Bakersfield, in between Chester Avenue and Eye Street, on 22nd Street. It is the largest transit center in the system, encompassing 1/2 of a city block. It has 15 off-street bus parking spaces. The transit center is staffed and includes restrooms, and shaded outdoor waiting areas. The transit center was constructed in the mid-1980s.

In addition to Golden Empire Transit, Kern Regional Transit also uses the transit center for one of its hubs. They currently have 6 routes that stop at it, although not all routes run 7-days a week. Their buses stop on the south side of the transit center.

 Southwest Transit Center 
The Southwest Transit Center is the transit center primarily serving Southwest, South, and Southeast Bakersfield. It is located on 1912 Wible Road south of Ming Avenue, directly adjacent to Valley Plaza Mall. It has 7 off-street bus parking spaces. The transit center is unstaffed, except for security, and contains restrooms and shaded waiting areas.

The transit center was constructed in the mid-1990s. In addition, two bus routes stop on Wible Road, north of the transit center. There is no room for expansion. In the past, it had been suggested moving the transit center to a new location, but those plans have been shelved in favor of other priorities.

 Bakersfield College Transit Center 
This transit center is located on Panorama Drive adjacent to Bakersfield College. It has 8 off-street parking spaces. Six spaces are currently used by GET and one is used by Kern Regional Transit. The transit center is unstaffed and contains restrooms and shaded waiting areas.

 CSUB Transit Center 
The California State University Bakersfield Transit Center finished construction in April 2021 located off Don Hart Drive West. The transit center contains 6 bus bays being used by GET and one is used by Kern Regional Transit. The center also contains new lighting and security measures. The center has no unpaid parking, and visitors must park in one of CSUB's parking lots.

 Services 

 Bicycle transportation 
All Golden Empire Transit buses are equipped with bike racks. Each rack can hold two bicycles. If the rack is full, the driver may allow bicycles to be carried on the bus, if there is room. Otherwise, bicycle riders must wait for the next bus. Most bus stops and all transit centers do not have bicycle racks or storage lockers.

To complement the bus system, there is also a network of bike paths and bike lanes. The Kern River Bike Path is a dedicated bike path that runs along the Kern River in the Kern River Parkway. It travels through almost the entire length of the city. Several spur routes diverge from the bike path, serving other locations such as California State University, Bakersfield. In addition, many  spaced arterials have dedicated, striped bike lanes. The width of the lane depends on whether on-street parking is allowed.

 The Reading Express 
The Reading Express is a program provided by Golden Empire Transit. Most buses are equipped with a small library of books for children from infant through third grade. The program is design for parents to read with their children while riding together on the bus. This also promotes education, as well as providing entertainment while traveling. Books can not be borrowed and must remain on the bus.

 Fare and fare collection 
The following are Golden Empire Transit fares, effective January 1, 2023 (children below 6 ride for free with fare-paying rider, limit is 3):On-Demand Paratransit''' rides are available for $3.00 a ride, no matter the distance, however, like On-Demand Reduced Fare, the customer must have an application on file in order to ride for the $3.00 fare price.

Golden Empire Transit currently uses GFI Odyssey fare box machines on its standard buses. They validate all US Coins and paper money through $20 bill, although it does not accept pennies nor give change. It also validates all ride passes used on fixed routes.

There are several features of the Odyssey machines that GET are not currently using, but could be implemented in the future. They include: processing credit cards, providing change in the form of printing pre-paid cards, deducting from pre-paid cards, and printing/validating transfer slips. Some of these features would require changes to GET's fare structure.

GET ride passes can be purchased with a variety methods. They can be bought in person at the Downtown Transit Center or GET headquarters on Golden State Avenue. They are also available at a variety of partner retail stores throughout the city (listed on their web site). Passes can also be purchased by mail or by phone. Since 2018 fares are also available to purchase in the Token Transit mobile ticketing app.

Fleet 
Golden Empire Transit's bus fleet generally consist of two types of buses, 40' standard buses for fix routes and 21' for demand buses (On-Demand service). The majority of the fleet is powered by compressed natural gas, with 10 buses that are fueled with Hydrogen Fuel Cells. The standard buses have a 38-seat capacity, and a low floor design to assist with handicapped passengers. The On-Demand vehicles have a 9-seat capacity, and the cutaway vehicles a wheelchair lift in the rear.

As part of its 2009 rebranding, GET is transitioned to a new bus color scheme. The paint scheme is blue, with a green bottom. A wavy yellow line separates the blue and green space. Near the front, the green section is wide enough for the "sunburst" GET logo. Only the newer buses have it. The older paint scheme is entirely white, with a red strip through the center. There is a break in the line for the old "fast transit" GET logo, which was in use from 1973–2009. As of 2015, certain routes have been changed, and the bus stops have been labelled with extra information. And GET partnered with the Transit app to locate where the bus is.

In addition, GET owns a variety of service vehicles. These range from sedans, to pickup trucks, to small flat bed trucks. There is also one tow truck in the fleet. These vehicles are generally numbered between 1 and 99.

In late 2022, GET opened the first Hydrogen Fueling station in Kern County on their property. The hydrogen fueling station fuels up the agency's 10 hydrogen buses.

Maintenance facility 
Golden Empire Transit's Maintenance Facility is located on Golden State Highway, next to the Kern River (on the north frontage road). GET moved here after outgrowing the previous facility located on 16th Street adjacent to the Oak Street bridge.  The current location also contains the headquarters for the transit authority. In addition to containing parking for the entire fleet, it also contains maintenance shops, bus wash, and cleaning facilities.

Future 
Golden Empire Transit is currently planning to move their facilities to a new location off of Mt. Vernon Ave. The California High Speed Rail Authority plans to take over the space currently operated by GET on F St. and Golden State Ave. in the future.

GET is also preparing to fulfil their mission of being completely zero emission by 2040.  GET constructed a hydrogen fueling station on site to fuel their growing hydrogen bus fleet.

References

External links 

Public transportation in Kern County, California
Transportation in Bakersfield, California
Bus transportation in California